Mirabile, from the Latin, means "wonderful" or "miraculous"
 Mirabile (novel), a science fiction novel by Janet Kagan, and the eponymous planet on which the novel is set
 Mirabile, Missouri, a community in the United States
 Mirabile illud, a Papal Encyclical
 Rete mirabile, an anatomical feature
 Horologium mirabile Lundense, a 15th-century astronomical clock

Biological names
 Acer mirabile
 Bulbophyllum mirabile
 Calliotectum mirabile
 Capsicum mirabile
 Cyclamen mirabile
 Glaziophyton mirabile
 Hydnellum mirabile
 Opisthostoma mirabile
 Planetetherium mirabile
 Pseudoditrichum mirabile
 Pontiothauma mirabile
 Speagonum mirabile
 Taraxacum mirabile
 Tropidion mirabile
 Typhonium mirabile
 Vexillum mirabile